Judah 1 is a proposed airline promoted as an "aviation ministry" with a focus on the Christian missionary travel market. The company bills itself as "the world's first and only Christian airline."

Founded in 2018, the proposed airline is based at Shreveport Regional Airport in Shreveport, Louisiana. The company is presently in the process of obtaining an air operator's certificate from the Federal Aviation Administration (FAA).

History
Judah 1 was founded in 2011 by Everett Aaron, who reportedly received the idea in a vision from God during prayer in 1994. He believes that a Christian-mission-oriented airline can better accommodate missionaries' special cargo needs than a traditional airline, and he intends not to charge fees for special cargo such as Bibles. 

Although the company plans to fly primarily on an on-demand basis rather than on a fixed schedule, it has applied for an air operator's certificate from the FAA as a non-scheduled air carrier under FAR Part 121, reportedly because certification as a private air charter carrier would limit the number of allowable flights per year and would not allow the sale of individual tickets.

The organization was originally based in Tulsa, Oklahoma, but it moved to Fort Worth Alliance Airport, and then moved again to North Texas Regional Airport (NTRA) in Denison, Texas when it became apparent that the lack of passenger facilities at Alliance would pose a substantial obstacle. The company has also reportedly had offices in North Richland Hills, Texas. Judah 1 conducted its first flight on 17 June 2019 when it flew a McDonnell Douglas MD-83 carrying a Houston church group from NTRA to Anchorage, Alaska.

In March 2020, the organization announced that it was relocating to Shreveport Regional, citing a shortage of hangar space and an absence of facilities suitable for Transportation Security Administration (TSA) security checks at NTRA; Aaron originally thought that, due to its small size, the proposed airline would be exempt from TSA security requirements.

Fleet
In December 2019, the Judah 1 fleet consisted of a McDonnell Douglas MD-83, a Cessna 414, and an IAI Westwind. 

In late 2018, Aaron claimed that, upon certification, the airline will operate 2 additional McDonnell Douglas MD-80 series aircraft and 2 Boeing 767s, and that the fleet will expand to 20 aircraft in 5 years.

References

External links
 

2018 establishments in Oklahoma
Christian organizations established in 2018
Proposed airlines of the United States
Transportation in Shreveport, Louisiana
Transportation companies based in Louisiana
Airlines based in Louisiana